The 1982 NCAA Division III women's basketball tournament was the inaugural tournament hosted by the NCAA to determine the national champion of NCAA Division III women's collegiate basketball in the United States. The 1982 AIAW Division III championship was a separate tournament.

Elizabethtown defeated UNC Greensboro in the championship game, 67–66 in overtime, to claim the Blue Jays' first Division III national title. 

The championship rounds were hosted at Elizabethtown College in Elizabethtown, Pennsylvania.

Bracket
First Round (round of sixteen)
 Elizabethtown 86, Chris. Newport 59
 TCNJ 70, Widener 43
 Clark (MA) 67, UMass Boston 49
 Augustana (IL) 83, Grove City 62
 Scranton 69, Manhattanville 49
 Pomona-Pitzer 68, Millikin 66
 Susquehanna 63, Frostburg St. 60
 UNC Greensboro 71, St. Andrews 63

Second Round (round of eight)
 Elizabethtown 74, TCNJ 58
 Clark (MA) 67, Augustana (IL) 56
 Pomona-Pitzer 62, Scranton 53 (OT)
 UNC Greensboro 74, Susquehanna 66

Final Four

All-tournament team
 Bev Hall, Elizabethtown (MOP)
 Page Lutz, Elizabethtown
 Carol Peschel, UNC Greensboro
 Carol Ferrin, Pomona-Pitzer
 Sherry Sydney, UNC Greensboro

See also
 1982 NCAA Division I women's basketball tournament
 1982 NCAA Division II women's basketball tournament
 1982 AIAW National Division I Basketball Championship
 1982 NAIA women's basketball tournament
 1982 NCAA Division III men's basketball tournament

References

 
NCAA Division III women's basketball tournament
1982 in sports in Pennsylvania